The Kagiano River is a river in the east part of Thunder Bay District in northwestern Ontario, Canada.

Course
The river begins at Devork Lake. It flows south, takes in the left tributary Deerskull Creek at Neotoma Lake and enters at the south end of Kagiano Lake. There, it takes in the right tributary Gentian Creek and left tributaries Palmquist Creek and Wort Creek. The river heads east out of the lake at the northeast end and controlled by a dam, takes in the right tributary Buhl Creek, then turns south. It takes in the left tributary Marmota Creek, reaches Solann Lake, turns east, and takes in the left tributary Pistol Creek. The river heads over Cedar Falls and Twin Falls, takes in the left tributary Fakeloo Creek and reaches its mouth at the Pic River. The Pic River flows to Lake Superior.

Hydroelectricity development
Kagiano Power, owned by the Ojibways of the Pic River First Nation, operates a run-of-the-river hydroelectricity generating station on the river at Twin Falls just upstream of the river's mouth.

Tributaries
Fakeloo Creek (left)
Pistol Creek (left)
Marmota Creek (left)
Buhl Creek (right)
Kagiano Lake
Gentian Creek (right)
Palmquist Creek (left)
Wort Creek (left)
Deerskull Creek (left)

See also
List of rivers of Ontario

References

Sources

Rivers of Thunder Bay District